The  is the Japanese name for a type of generator of static electricity used for electric experiments in the 18th century. In Japan, Hiraga Gennai presented his own elekiter in 1776, derived from an elekiter from Holland. The elekiter consists of a small box that uses the power of friction to generate electricity and store it.

The Elekiter relied on the various Western experiments with static electricity during the 18th century, which depended on the discovery that electricity could be generated through friction, and on the invention of the Leyden jar in the 1740s, as a convenient means to store static electricity in rather large quantities. Hiraga Gennai acquired an elekiter from the Netherlands during his second trip to Nagasaki in 1770, and made a formal demonstration of his elekiter in 1776.

See also
 Rangaku
 Japanese words of Dutch origin

Notes

References
 Suzuki, Kazuyoshi (2006) Edo Technology (Japanese: 見て楽しむ江戸のテクノロジー), Suuken Publishing, 

18th century in Japan
History of science and technology in Japan